SK Vorwärts Steyr is an Austrian association football club based in Steyr. It was founded in 1919. They play at the Vorwärts Stadium. Currently the club has about 300 members. Is one of the oldest football clubs in Upper Austria. In 1999 the club went bankrupt and reformed in lower leagues later in 2001. In 2011 Vorwärts was promoted to the Regional League (Middle) which is part of the third division of Austrian league football. In 2018 they were promoted to the Austrian Second League.

History

The club was founded as Steyrer Fußballklub Vorwärts with the club colours of red and white, the official founding ceremony was held at the Casino Steyr on 14 April 1919. The first match of Vorwärts Steyr was on 15 June 1919 in Linz against Linzer ASK (result 2–2). Already in its first year, the club won the Upper Austrian League; a national league did not exist at that time. In 1949 after dominating the state leagues, they managed to get to the Austrian Cup final which was held in Vienna against Austria Vienna which they lost 2–5, however reaching the final is still considered a major success even to this day. In the 1960s and 1970s, the club spent all its time in the Regionalliga Mitte or the Upper Austrian League. This twenty-year dry spell ended in 1979, when they returned to the Second Division. From 1982 Vorwärts established themselves in the second division until in 1988, after 37 years, when they gained promotion to the highest Austrian league, the Bundesliga where the club remained until 1996. The early-1990s saw the club reach its best ever league position in the 1990/91 and 1991/92 seasons, seventh place in the table. In 1995 they played in the Intertoto Cup and won the group stage remaining unbeaten (2–1 away win against Eintracht Frankfurt) and missed out on the UEFA Cup qualifiers only after an away defeat to Racing Strasbourg. By 1995 the club was deeply in debt with about 15 million shillings owed, so they required a bailout in the form of a guarantee from the town of Steyr. The bitter 0–2 defeat against LASK Linz on 29 May 1999 sealed the relegation from the top flight. Finally, the club had their license permanently withdrawn on 11 January 2000, ceasing operations and forfeiting the remaining matches. With an application for compulsory settlement, bankruptcy proceedings were opened. The club restarted from the lowest amateur division in August 2001. Since then the club has steadily risen through the amateur leagues and in 2018 returned to the 2nd tier of Austrian football.

Honours

Before the bankruptcy

1 Austrian Cup Finalist: 1949
13 Upper Austrian Champions 
2 Upper Austrian Cup Winners
12 Bundesliga seasons: 1950–1951, 1988–1996, 1999

Since the reformation

2. Liga Ost OÖ Winners: 2003
1. Liga Ost OÖ Winners: 2005
Bezirksliga Ost OÖ Winners: 2006
OÖ Landespokalsieger Winners: 2009
Upper Austrian Cup Winners: 2010, 2013
Fourth Division Champions: 2011, 2013

Fans
The club has seen a sharp decline in attendances since the bankruptcy however the team is still often accompanied by many fans even at away games; in big games the away following frequently exceeds more than 1000 'red-whites'. The largest fan club, Südchaos-Steyr, was founded in 2009 and is considered to be an ultras group, and they usually occupy the South stand of the stadium. They publish a fanzine called Bengalen, Bier und Bosna.

Current squad 
As of 7 February 2023.

Out on loan

External links 

 Official website

 
Association football clubs established in 1919
Steyr
Football clubs in Austria
1919 establishments in Austria